Four (stylized as all caps) is the fourth studio album by English-Irish boy band One Direction, released on 17 November 2014 by Columbia Records and Syco Music. The album was preceded by two singles, "Steal My Girl" and "Night Changes", both achieving platinum status in the US, and scoring the band their tenth and eleventh UK top-ten hits. The album was also One Direction's last with member Zayn Malik, who announced he was leaving the band on 25 March 2015.

The album received generally positive reviews from music critics. It debuted at number one in 18 countries, including the United Kingdom, Australia and the United States. With Four, One Direction became the first band to have their first four albums debut at number one in the United States. According to the International Federation of the Phonographic Industry (IFPI), Four was the sixth best-selling album of 2014, with 3.2 million copies sold worldwide.

Background and development
On 27 April 2014, it was confirmed that One Direction were working on their fourth studio album. Louis Tomlinson and Liam Payne worked on the majority of the album with songwriters Julian Bunetta, John Ryan, and Jamie Scott; Harry Styles and Zayn Malik also co-wrote tracks with Bunetta, Ryan, Scott and producer Johan Carlsson.

The name and cover of the album were announced on 8 September on One Direction's official website, along with a free download of a song called "Fireproof", which was available for 24 hours. "Fireproof" was written by Payne and Tomlinson along with John Ryan, Jamie Scott and Julian Bunetta, who also wrote their single "Story of My Life". In the 24-hour span, 1.1 million downloads were generated. The song was uploaded onto the band's Vevo account on 22 September.

In an interview with Simon Cowell, it was revealed that one of the songs for the album will be titled "18". The song was written by Ed Sheeran, who also wrote "Little Things" and "Moments" for the group. Horan came up with the name of the album, commemorating the fact that it is the band's fourth album and that it has been four years since their formation.

The album was leaked two weeks prior to its release.

Tour

The On the Road Again Tour was announced on the Australian breakfast television program Today, where the band gave a pre-recorded interview releasing the details of their return to Australia. It was later announced that the band would also be touring Asia and Africa. The group will be making debuts for some countries, particularly in the United Arab Emirates. On 24 October 2014, the official One Direction site announced several more tour dates, with shows across Europe, the US, and Canada.

The tour began on 7 February 2015 in Sydney, Australia and ended on 31 October 2015 in Sheffield, England. On 19 March 2015, it was announced that group member Zayn Malik would take a break from the tour due to stress. Malik announced his official departure from the group just six days later. The tour grossed $208 million from 80 shows, selling over 2.3 million tickets.

Singles
"Steal My Girl" was released as the album's first single on 29 September 2014 worldwide and on 19 October 2014 in the UK. "Night Changes" was then released as the album's second single on 14 November 2014.

Promotional singles
There were five promotional singles released on five different days; when fans pre-ordered the album, they received an instant download of the songs. "Ready to Run" was released as the first promotional single on 6 November. "Where Do Broken Hearts Go" was released as the second promotional single on 10 November. "18" was released as the third promotional single on 11 November. "Girl Almighty" was released as the fourth promotional single on 12 November. "Fool's Gold" was released as the fifth promotional single on 13 November.

Critical reception

Four received generally positive reviews from music critics. Some argued that the members' songwriting showed signs of maturity, while others claimed the musical content was too similar to the band's previous work. On Metacritic, which assigns a rating out of 100, the album received a score of 65, which indicates generally favorable reviews.

Neil McCormick of The Daily Telegraph found "an unlikely comparison to Bruce Springsteen in the quintet's latest offering", and that Four was "hard to dislike: it's cheery, uplifting, high spirited and good fun", but did still say it was "songwriting by numbers". AllMusic's review said it was the group's "fourth well-crafted, packed-with-great-pop-songs album in a row", although did cynically point out the pattern of each of said albums being released just in time for "optimal holiday-season gift-giving". Tshepo Mokoena of The Guardian gave the album a more mixed review of three-stars, again drawing comparisons with Springsteen but with the caveat of being "hardly groundbreaking pop", and Jim Faber of the New York Daily News also gave three stars and praised the group for "confronting their limitations" but at the same time questioned why whilst doing so they spent "so much time looking back with longing", pointed out an apparent "anxiety" and expressed disappointment that whilst Four represents a step forward in their history, it "represents a step back in both sound and sensibility". Andy Gill, writing for The Independent, commented that the album is "a long way from the standard X Factor fare" while praising the songwriting of Tomlinson and Payne.

Kitty Empire, writing for The Guardian, stated that the album "ups the chords a smidgen further" and that the group's "new direction owes a substantial debt to the big guitar pop of the 80s" while also adding that the group's music is "no longer kids' stuff". Jon Dolan of Rolling Stone wrote that "One Direction extend their winning streak, with echoes of the 1970s and 1980s" while also commenting that "the vocal duties are divvied up in ways that highlight the singers’ similarities" and that they "have mastered the ancient boy-band art of whispering directly into listeners’ ears". Jamieson Cox of Time wrote that "the album as a whole takes another step towards the stadium-sized rock first suggested by Midnight Memories and "their take on the sound is immaculate: arrangements are grand and spacious, with guitar lines glistening and rhythms cavernous and blooming, and the band’s increasingly distinct vocals — allowed to sparkle via the use of harmony more than ever — at the forefront" while commenting that the album sounds similar to "80s arena anthems in the vein of Journey, Bryan Adams, and Bruce Springsteen. Andrew Unterberger of Spin praised the album's 80's sound while commenting that the songs are "intoxicating, adrenalizing, and undeniably visceral blasts of old-school pop/rock, furthered by the group’s commitment to patently ridiculous lyrics" while ending the review with "the question of whether they can find a permanent safe haven is less certain — if they pretend to be Bon Jovi for long enough, will we forget that they started out as New Kids on the Block? Probably not, but hell, no boy band has ever made it this far and still managed to sell this much and sound this good".

James Reed of the Boston Globe commented that the album "is the first one that doesn’t immediately summon memories of The X Factor and that although "its mix of driving power pop, muscular harmonies, and acoustic alchemy is as manicured as the group’s previous bestsellers", is also "hints at a broader future for the lads". Mikael Wood of the Los Angeles Times said that the album "is their best work yet" while comparing the sound to Fleetwood Mac, The Beach Boys, and David Bowie. Writing with Vice, Laura Reineke wrote that "Four is "a focused, genuinely fun pop-rock album, and a sign of truly promising growth that isn't likely to taper off soon" while adding that "it’s smarter lyrically, warmer emotionally, and considerably more cohesive than any of their three previous studio outings".

Less positive reviews came from Chuck Arnold of Billboard magazine and James Rainis of Slant Magazine, both awarding just two-and-a-half stars. The former claimed "One Direction aren't ready to let go of their bubble-gum days", whilst Rainis ended his take by saying "the album's irresistibly obvious choruses, hackneyed sentiments, and puppy-eyed earnestness can come off as endearing when the songwriting is clever enough, but every misstep is, despite the band's efforts to assert more control over their music, a painful reminder of One Direction's status as a manufactured, focus-grouped pop entity." Annie Zaleski, writing for The A.V. Club, wrote that the album lacks "creative urgency" and "is dominated by pastel synth washes and inoffensive whiffs of EDM, as well as midtempo syrupy croons and sonic retreads" while ending her review with "that retreat from distinct personality—something the members possess in spades—is perhaps the most disappointing thing about Four." Ed Power of The Irish Independent commented that the album "falls short of the radical decoupling from the past such ambitions demand" and that "it's a little rugged around the edges yet at the centre is blandly, tiresomely soppy".

The album was placed at number eleven on Cosmopolitans list of "The 20 Best Albums of 2014". Jessica Goodman and Ryan Kistobak of The Huffington Post included the album on their list of 2014's best releases, claiming that "2014 will forever be known as the year that we realized One Direction was actually, dare we say, good." Goodman further complimented the album as a "complex, feel-good trip down young love lane". Billboard named Four the best boy band album of the last thirty years, calling it "the absolute standard-bearer for the last decade of pop".

Commercial performance
Released on 12 November 2014, the album quickly rose to the top of the UK Albums Chart, with 142,000 copies sold during its first week. The album scored One Direction their third consecutive number one album. Based on UK sales, it was certified Gold by the BPI in its first week, and certified Platinum in its fourth week.

The deluxe edition of Four became the top charted album on iTunes in some 67 countries. In the US, the album debuted at No. 1 on the Billboard 200 chart on the week ending 23 November 2014, with sales of 387,000. One Direction thus became the first musical group to have each of their first four studio albums debut at No. 1; the Monkees and the Kingston Trio also reached No. 1 with their first four albums but not in the first week of sales. One Direction follows three solo artists who have attained No. 1 status with their first four albums: Britney Spears and DMX in 2003, and Beyoncé in 2011. (In 2013, Beyoncé's fifth album also debuted at No. 1.) Four sold 814,000 copies in the US in 2014, the ninth best-selling album of the year. The album reached its millionth sales mark in the U.S. in August 2015, and has sold 1,016,000 as of October 2015.

Accolades

Decade-end lists

Track listing

Notes
 signifies an additional producer
 signifies a vocal producer

Personnel
Credits taken from Four liner notes.

 Afterhrs – producer
 Damon Bunetta – background vocals
 Julian Bunetta – drums, engineer, mixing, musician, producer, programming, vocal producer, background vocals
 Peter Bunetta – background vocals
 Ben "Bengineer" Chang – engineer, vocal producer
 Tom Coyne – mastering
 Ian Dowling – engineer
 Ed Drewett – background vocals
 Ian Franzino – assistant engineer, engineer, musician, producer, background vocals
 Teddy Geiger – producer, background vocals
 Serban Ghenea – mixing
 Andrew Haas – bass, engineer, musician
 John Hanes – mixing engineer
 Wayne Hector – background vocals
 Niall Horan – guitar, vocals
 Helene Horlyck – vocal coach
 Ash Howes – mixing
 Noah Livingston – background vocals
 Zayn Malik – vocals
 Randy Merrill – assistant
 Sam Miller – additional production, engineer, vocal producer
 One Direction – primary artist, background vocals
 Alex Oriet – additional production, engineer
 Liam Payne – vocals
 Luke Potashnick – guitar
 Matt Rad – additional production, drums, guitar, keyboards, piano, producer, programming
 Steve Robson – bass, producer
 John Ryan – engineer, guitar, musician, producer, programming, vocal producer, background vocals, wurlitzer
 Jamie Scott – guitar, keyboards, musician, producer, background vocals
 Ryan Joseph Shaughnessy – photography
 Harry Styles – vocals
 Louis Tomlinson – vocals
 Paro Westerlund – producer, programming
 Joe Zook – mixing

Charts

Weekly charts

Year-end charts

Decade-end charts

Certifications

Release history

References

One Direction albums
Columbia Records albums
2014 albums
Syco Music albums
Albums produced by Steve Robson
Albums produced by Johan Carlsson